Tappeh (also known as Qareh Tappeh, Qūch‘alī Tappeh, Tappeh-ye Khalaj, and Tepe) is a village in Malmir Rural District, Sarband District, Shazand County, Markazi Province, Iran. At the 2006 census, its population was 18, in 6 families.

References 

Populated places in Shazand County